The Stade Amable-et-Micheline-Lozai is a multi-purpose stadium located in Le Petit-Quevilly, France. It is home to US Quevilly-Rouen.

History  
The stadium was inaugurated in 1912 under the name of Stade de la Porte-de-Diane. On 13 September 1954, it was renamed in honor of the historic leaders of the club.

References

Bibliography  
 

1912 establishments in France
Football venues in France
US Quevilly-Rouen Métropole
Sports venues completed in 1912
Sports venues in Seine-Maritime